Everything Is Oh Yeah is a 2019 studio album from American pop rock singer Josie Cotton. Recorded in 1986, the album was unreleased for several years due to Cotton losing her record contract.

Critical reception
The editorial staff of AllMusic Guide gave the release four out of five stars, with reviewer Tim Sendra summing up, "Cotton's voice is a thing of wonder that's alternately heartbreakingly sincere and gum-snappingly playful, the songs are endlessly frothy and fun, and the overall joyous spirit can't be ruined by less than perfect production. It's too bad the album was buried for so long, but the fact that it came out at all is well worth celebrating."

Track listing
All songs written by Josie Cotton, except where noted.
"Everything Is Oh Yeah" – 2:40
"The Way You Rock" – 2:49
"If You Really Want Me To" – 1:55
"Boulevard" – 3:00
"Sometimes Girl" – 3:56
"The Night Before" (John Lennon, Paul McCartney) – 3:28
"Loves Love" (Bobby Paine, Larson Paine) – 2:52
"Hand Over Your Heart" (Paine, Paine) – 2:42
"Money" Paine, Paine) – 2:59
"Far Away from the Crowd" – 3:51
"Fine as You Are" (J. B. Frank)  – 3:29
"Here Comes My Baby" (Cat Stevens) – 3:13
"Systematic Way" – 3:23
"Sheena Is a Punk Rocker" (Joey Ramone) – 2:47

Personnel
Josie Cotton – Composer, Mixing, Primary Artist, Producer, Vocals (Background)

Timmy Arroyo – photography
Billy Bremner – guitar
Tommy Burns – bass, drum programming, guitar, keyboards
J. B. Frank – keyboards
Geza X – guitar, production
Don Heffington – drums
The Martin Brothers – horn section
Pete McRae – guitar
Jeff Mince – drums
Prescott Niles – bass guitar
Bobby Paine – bass guitar, guitar, narrator
Larson Paine – production, backing vocals
Paul Roessler – keyboards, mixing, production, backing vocals
Hunt Sales – bass guitar, drum programming, guitar, production
Brian Setzer – guitar, backing vocals
Mike Watanabe – bass guitar
Miko Watanabe – bass guitar
Marcus Watkins – guitar

References

External links

2019 albums
Josie Cotton albums
Cleopatra Records albums
Albums produced by Geza X